Dancing Machine is a 1990 French thriller film starring Alain Delon.

Plot

A hardboiled inspector investigates the suspicious deaths of several young female dancers who were fellow students at a studio run by an embittered, autocratic former superstar.

Cast
 Alain Delon as Alan Wolf
 Claude Brasseur as Inspector Michel Eparvier
 Patrick Dupond as Chico
 Étienne Chicot as  Commissioner Le Guellec 
 Tonya Kinzinger as Daphné
 Marina Saura as Ella Cebrian
 Consuelo de Haviland as Liselote Wagner

References

External links

French thriller films
1990 films
Films produced by Alain Delon
Films directed by Gilles Béhat
1990s French films